Beauceville is a city in, and the seat of, the Municipalité régionale de comté Beauce-Centre in Quebec, Canada. It is part of the Chaudière-Appalaches region and the population was 6,185 as of the Canada 2021 Census.

Beauceville's new constitution dates from 1998, when it amalgamated with Saint-François-Ouest and Saint-François-de-Beauce. The previous city was also the creation of a merging between Beauceville and Beauceville-Est, distinction made because each shared a bank of the Chaudière River. Beauceville was the first municipality in Beauce to be constituted as a city when it detached from Saint-François-de-Beauce in 1904.

Geography 
Covering an area of 164.56 km2, Beauceville extends on both banks of the Chaudière River, 85 km south of Quebec City, 55 km from the border of the US state of Maine and 150 km from Sherbrooke.

Demographics 

Transportation
Autoroute 73 crosses Beauceville's territory at exit 61.

Notable people 
 William Chapman, poet born in Saint-François-de-Beauce
 Nicole Jolicoeur, artist
 Jeanne St. Laurent, wife to former Prime Minister Louis St. Laurent
 Stéphane Veilleux, National Hockey League player
 Marie-Philip Poulin, hockey player, Olympic Gold Medalist (2010, 2014, 2022)

References

Commission de toponymie du Québec
Ministère des Affaires municipales, des Régions et de l'Occupation du territoire

External links
Ville de Beauceville 

Incorporated places in Chaudière-Appalaches
Cities and towns in Quebec